Ida Daussy (born 17 July 1969), also known by her Korean name Seo Hye-na, is a French-born South Korean celebrity. She is a professor at the Department of French Language & Culture of Sookmyung Women's University. She received a presidential citation in 2005 by the South Korean government. Her television work turned her into a "household name" in South Korea.

Personal life
Daussy, a native of Fécamp, studied international business at the University of Le Havre. She came to South Korea on an exchange programme during her postgraduate studies in 1991, and married a man from Gyeongsang in 1993. She naturalised as a South Korean citizen after the marriage. The couple had two children, and divorced in 2009. She has registered the hangul transcription of her original French surname as her legal Korean surname.

Publications
 봉주르 여봉 싸랑해요 (1996), 
 이다도시의 행복공감 (2006), 
 이다도시의 생활체험 프랑스식 감성교육법 (2000), 
 이다도시 한국, 수다로 풀다 (2007), 
 봉주르 와인 (2009),

References

External links

Naver blog

1969 births
Living people
Naturalized citizens of South Korea
People from Fécamp
South Korean people of French descent
South Korean television personalities